Béla Szakcsi Lakatos  (8 July 1943 – 2 October 2022), also known by the mononyms Szakcsi or Sa-Chi, was an Hungarian jazz pianist, keyboardist, arranger and composer.

Life and career 
In the 1970s he was part of the Aladár Pege’s quartet, with whom he performed at the Montreux Jazz Festival  to great critical acclaim, and later he was part of the bands Rákfogó and Saturnus, as well as leader of his own ensemble. He recorded 16 albums and composed several musicals.

Szakcsi Lakatos is regarded as a key figure in the spreading of jazz and fusion genres in Hungary. He died on 2 October 2022, at the age of 79.

References

External links 
 
  
 
 

1943 births
2022 deaths 
People from Budapest
Hungarian jazz pianists
Hungarian male composers
Recipients of the Kossuth Prize